Abigail Lofaro (born September 1961) is a Maltese judge. She is a graduate of the University of Malta. Alongside Anna Felice, she was the first female judge appointed in Malta.

See also 

 Judiciary of Malta

References 

Living people
1961 births
21st-century Maltese judges
University of Malta alumni
Maltese women
Women judges